Paul, Weiss, Rifkind, Wharton & Garrison LLP (known as Paul, Weiss) is an American multinational law firm headquartered on Sixth Avenue in New York City. The firm maintains an all-equity partnership, with approximately 150 partners. By profits per equity partner, it is the fifth most profitable law firm in the world.

History 
Paul, Weiss's core practice areas are in litigation and corporate law. In addition to its headquarters in New York, the firm has offices in Washington, D.C., San Francisco, Wilmington, Delaware, Toronto, London, Tokyo, Beijing, and Hong Kong.

1875 - 1949 
The firm that eventually became Paul, Weiss, Rifkind, Wharton & Garrison was started in New York in 1875 by Samuel William Weiss and Julius Frank as a general commercial practice. In 1923, Samuel's son, Louis Weiss, started his own firm with John F. Wharton. That firm later merged with Samuel's firm, and the new firm became Cohen, Cole, Weiss & Wharton. In the 1930s, the firm represented one of the Scottsboro boys. In 1946, Lloyd K. Garrison and Randolph Paul joined the firm, bringing the firm up to thirteen lawyers. The name changed to Paul, Weiss, Wharton & Garrison.

In 1946, Paul, Weiss became the first major New York law firm to have a woman partner, Carolyn Agger. Agger worked in the firm's Washington office, which was established the year she was hired. Three years later, in 1949, the firm hired William Thaddeus Coleman Jr., a Black graduate of Harvard University Law School. This was the first time that a major New York City law firm hired a person of color. 1949 was also when the firm moved its headquarters to midtown Manhattan.

1950 - 2000 
In 1950, Simon Rifkind joined the firm and it became Paul, Weiss, Rifkind, Wharton & Garrison. At the time, the firm had 12 partners, only one of whom did trial work; Rifkind wanted to change that and started to grow the firm's litigation department. Then, in 1957, Arthur Liman joined the firm. He later served as chief counsel in the Senate investigation of the Iran-Contra affair in 1987. In 1966, Rifkind recruited Theodore Sorensen who became the firm's first international lawyer. He drafted a constitution for Tajikistan in 1993 when the nation emerged from the former Soviet Union.

Controversies 
In 2018, Paul Weiss was criticized when it released a photograph on its LinkedIn of recently promoted partners, all of whom were white. Additionally, the photograph included only one woman partner who had been relegated to the bottom corner of the image. Although Paul Weiss had a reputation for being more diverse than other elite big-law firms, the announcement drew criticisms that even "diverse" big-law firms still partook in racist and sexist methods of employment and promotion. The photograph served as a "lightning rod" for the growing frustration that elite law careers are still largely reserved for white men.

A 2021 assessment singled out Paul, Weiss among law firms as engaging in the most litigation, lobbying and transactional work for fossil fuel companies. The company received the lowest grade in a 2021 scorecard of law firms on climate change actions. The firm had represented fossil fuel companies in 30 cases over the five preceding years. In January and February 2020, students at Harvard Law School, Yale Law School, New York University School of Law, and the University of Michigan Law School protested the firm's recruitment events over its representation of Exxon Mobil Corporation.

Notable representations 
 Paul, Weiss assisted Thurgood Marshall to reverse the doctrine of "separate but equal" in Brown v. Board of Education.
 Paul, Weiss represents detainees held by the U.S. military at the Guantanamo Bay detention camp.  A number of the detainees went on a hunger strike to protest alleged inhumane conditions.  In response, prison authorities force-fed detainees.  Paul, Weiss attorneys filed an emergency application demanding information about the condition of the detainees. In a ruling in October 2005, Judge Gladys Kessler of the United States District Court for the District of Columbia ordered the government to provide the detainees' lawyers with 24 hours' notice before initiating a force-feeding, and to provide lawyers with the detainees’ medical records a week before force-feeding.
 Paul, Weiss advised the casino operating unit of Caesars Entertainment in its bankruptcy proceedings, taking over the role from O'Melveny & Myers in 2011. It later became known that Apollo Global Management, a private equity sponsor of Caesars, was also a Paul, Weiss client. Paul, Weiss was found to have a conflict of interest in the matter, although an investigation found no actual harm to Caesars or its creditors.
 Paul, Weiss represented the China Medical Technologies (CMED) Audit Committee in investigating an anonymous letter alleging possible illegal and fraudulent activities by management, prior to CMED being discovered to have been the subject of a  $355 million fraud.
Paul, Weiss represented Edith Windsor in challenging the Defense of Marriage Act in United States v. Windsor in 2013.
Paul, Weiss issued the report in the Deflategate football inflation controversy in 2015.
 In 2010, Paul, Weiss represented General Atlantic in its acquisition of First Republic Bank, in a $1.86 billion deal.
 In 2016, Fox News hired the firm to conduct an internal investigation about Roger Ailes, leading to the end of Ailes' career.

Pro bono 
In 2018, Paul, Weiss worked pro bono to try and find over 400 parents who were separated from their families at the southern border of the United States and then deported. The work was part of the federal American Civil Liberties Union (ACLU) lawsuit, which was brought against the Trump administration over its family separation policy. ACLU asked Paul, Weiss to head the committee that worked with three nonprofits to find the parents. By November, almost all of the 400 deported parents had been found.

In 2019, Pablo Fernandez was released from jail after being wrongfully convicted of murder. He had served over twenty-four years in prison. Lawyers from Paul, Weiss were his pro-bono defense team.

Diversity
On October 10, 2007, Paul, Weiss was included in a ranking of Manhattan law firms by the national law student group Building a Better Legal Profession. The organization ranked firms by billable hours, demographic diversity, and pro bono participation. For diversity among partner attorneys, the firm was ranked in the 61st to 80th percentile for Black, Hispanic, Asian, and LGBT categories. Paul, Weiss was also ranked number 52 out of the 74 firms evaluated, for opportunities for advancement for female attorneys. In 2019, the nonprofit group Lawyers of Color reported that Paul, Weiss had the highest percentage of black lawyers of the 400 firms it ranked. In 2020, women comprised 26% of Paul, Weiss’ partnership, all equity partners. This is slightly higher than the average for law firms (23.6% as reported by the National Association for Law Placement).

William Thaddeus Coleman Jr. was the first black lawyer hired at the firm. When he was hired in 1949, it was the first time ever that a major New York City law firm hired a person of color as an associate. Pauli Murray, a civil rights and gender equality activist, was an associate at Paul, Weiss from 1956 to 1960. Jeh Johnson, a lawyer and the fourth director and secretary of Homeland Security, was hired by Paul, Weiss in 1994 as the firm's first African-American partner. After he stepped down from Homeland Security in 2017 he rejoined the firm's litigation department. Loretta Lynch, the first black woman to serve as United States attorney general, joined Paul, Weiss in 2019 as a litigation partner. 

In 2020, Paul, Weiss said it wanted to unite law firms and public-interest organizations across the U.S. in a pro-bono effort to root out racism. Attorney Jeh Johnson of Paul, Weiss was assigned to serve as New York State Chief Judge Janet DiFiore's Special Advisor on Equal Justice in the Courts.

Affiliations

In 2022, Paul, Weiss, Rifkind, Wharton & Garrison was a founding member of the Legal Alliance for Reproductive Rights, a coalition of United States law firms offering free legal services to people seeking and providing abortions in the wake of Dobbs v. Jackson Women's Health Organization, which overruled Roe v. Wade.

Name partners 
Randolph E. Paul
Louis S. Weiss
Simon H. Rifkind
John F. Wharton
Lloyd K. Garrison
Arthur Joseph Goldberg

See also
List of largest law firms by profits per partner

References

Law firms based in New York City
Law firms established in 1945
Foreign law firms with offices in Hong Kong
Foreign law firms with offices in Japan
Paul, Weiss, Rifkind, Wharton & Garrison people
1945 establishments in New York City